The Bayan class was a group of four armored cruisers built for the Imperial Russian Navy around the beginning of the 20th century. Two of the ships were built in France, as Russian shipyards had no spare capacity. The lead ship, was built several years earlier than the later three. The ship participated in several of the early naval battles of the Russo-Japanese War of 1904–05, and provided naval gunfire support for the Imperial Russian Army until she struck a mine. Bayan was trapped in harbor during the subsequent Siege of Port Arthur, and was sunk by Japanese artillery. She was salvaged and put into service with the Imperial Japanese Navy with the name of Aso. She mostly served as a training ship before she was converted into a minelayer in 1920. The ship was sunk as a target in 1932.

Her three sisters were all assigned to the Baltic Fleet.  was the first ship lost by the Russians during World War I when she was sunk by a German submarine in October 1914. The two surviving ships were modified to lay mines, and participated in the Battle of Åland Islands in 1915 and the German invasion of the Estonian islands in 1917. They were decommissioned in 1918 and sold for scrap in 1922.

Background

The Bayan class marked a departure from the previous Russian armored cruisers, as they were smaller ships designed to serve as scouts for the fleet rather than as commerce raiders. Authorized in the 1896–1902 building program, the design was outsourced to a French shipyard, Forges et Chantiers de la Méditerranée, because Russian shipyards were already at full capacity. Negotiations began in March 1897, and a contract was signed in May 1898 for one ship with delivery in 36 months.

The Navy was reasonably pleased with the first ship, Bayan, and decided to order another cruiser after the start of the Russo-Japanese War in February 1904. Russian shipyards were still unavailable, so the Navy decided to simply order a repeat with minor modifications based on war experience. This was an attempt to minimize the work load on the Naval Technical Committee (Morskoi tekhnicheskii komitet), but they proved to require more attention than planned and a contract was not signed until 20 April 1905. The contract specified that all drawings would be turned over to allow for the construction of two identical ships in St. Petersburg, using newly available slipways. These changes generally added weight and the armor was reduced in thickness to compensate, although the change from Harvey armor to more resistant Krupp armor meant that there was little actual loss in protection.

Description
The ships had a crew of 573 officers and men.

They had two vertical triple-expansion steam engines, each driving a single propeller shaft, using steam provided by 26 Belleville boilers.

Armament

The main armament of the Bayan-class ships consisted of two  45-caliber guns in single-gun turrets fore and aft of the superstructure. The ships' eight 45-caliber  Canet Model 1891 quick-firing (QF) guns were mounted in casemates on the sides of the ship's hull. They had a range of  when fired at an elevation of +20°.

A number of smaller guns were carried for close-range defense against torpedo boats. These included twenty 50-caliber  Canet Model 1891 QF guns. Eight of these were mounted in casemates in the side of the hull and in the superstructure. The remaining guns were located above the 6-inch gun casemates in pivot mounts with gun shields. The Bayan class also mounted eight (Bayan) or four  Hotchkiss guns in the three later ships. They fired a  shell.

Protection

Ships

Service

Bayan was assigned to the First Pacific Squadron after completion, and based at Port Arthur from the end of 1903. She suffered minor damage during the Battle of Port Arthur at the beginning of the Russo-Japanese War and participated in the action of 13 April 1904, when Vice Admiral Tōgō Heihachirō successfully lured out a portion of the Pacific Squadron, including Vice Admiral Stepan Makarov's flagship, the battleship . When Makarov spotted the five Japanese battleships, he turned back for Port Arthur, and Petropavlovsk struck a minefield and quickly sank after a mine detonated one of her magazines. After bombarding Imperial Japanese Army positions on 27 July, Bayan struck a mine and was under repair for the next month or so. She was subsequently trapped in Port Arthur and sunk at her mooring by Japanese howitzer shells on 8 December.

The ship was refloated by Japanese engineers the following year; repairs, re-boilering, and the replacement of her armament with Japanese weapons took until 1908 to complete. Renamed Aso in Japanese service, she initially served as a training ship before she was converted into a minelayer in 1920. Aso was decommissioned on 1 April 1930 and renamed Hai Kan No. 4. She was sunk as a target on 4 August 1932 by two submarine torpedoes.

All three of the later ships were assigned to the Baltic Fleet upon completion, although Admiral Makarov was detached to the Mediterranean several times before the start of World War I in 1914. During the first month of the war, Pallada captured codebooks from the German cruiser  that had run aground. She was torpedoed by the German submarine  on 11 October 1914 and was lost with all hands. Her wreck was discovered in 2000.

The surviving sisters were modified to lay mines shortly after the war began. They laid mines themselves during the war and provided cover for other ships laying minefields. Admiral Makarov and Bayan fought several inconclusive battles with German ships during the war, including the Battle of Åland Islands in mid–1915, and they also defended Moon Sound during the German invasion of the Estonian islands in late 1917, where Bayan was badly damaged. Their 75 mm guns were removed in 1916–1917 and replaced by one 8-inch and four 6-inch guns. A pair of anti-aircraft guns were also added. Admiral Makarov was in Helsingfors when Finland declared independence in March 1918, and was forced to evacuate even though the Gulf of Finland was still frozen over. She reached Kronstadt after what became known as the "Ice Voyage". The sisters were decommissioned in 1918 and sold for scrap in 1922.

Notes

Footnotes

References

External links

 WWI Naval Operations in the Baltic Theater 
 Site in English with photographs

Cruiser classes